Soyuz 5 (Union 5) was a Soyuz mission using the Soyuz 7K-OK spacecraft launched by the Soviet Union on 15 January 1969, which docked with Soyuz 4 in orbit. It was the first docking of two crewed spacecraft of any nation, and the first transfer of crew from one space vehicle to another of any nation, the only time a transfer was accomplished with a space walk – two months before the United States Apollo 9 mission performed the first internal crew transfer.

The mission, flown by cosmonauts Boris Volynov, Aleksei Yeliseyev, and Yevgeny Khrunov,  was also memorable for its dramatic re-entry. The craft's service module did not separate, so it entered the atmosphere nose-first, leaving Volynov hanging by his restraining straps. As the craft aerobraked, the atmosphere burned through the service module, allowing the remaining descent module to right itself before the escape hatch was burned through. During the descent, the parachute lines tangled and the landing rockets failed, resulting in a hard landing that broke Volynov's teeth.

Crew

Backup crew

Reserve crew

Mission parameters 
 Mass:  
 Perigee:  
 Apogee: 
 Inclination: 51.69°
 Period: 88.87 minutes

Space walk 
  Yeliseyev and Khrunov  - EVA 1
 EVA 1 Start: 16 January 1969
 EVA 1 End: 16 January, 01:15 GMT
 Duration: 37 minutes

1900s

Mission highlights 

Soyuz 5 was piloted by commander Boris Volynov and carried flight engineers Aleksei Yeliseyev and Yevgeny Khrunov as the crew to be transferred to Soyuz 4 for reentry. The mission plan contained scientific, technical, and medical-biological research, testing of spacecraft systems and design elements, docking of piloted spacecraft, and transfer of cosmonauts from one craft to another in orbit.

Volynov remained behind on Soyuz 5, and returned to Earth in a remarkable re-entry. The service module of the Soyuz failed to separate after retrofire, but by that point it was too late to abort. While this had occurred on various Vostok and Voskhod flights, it was a much more serious problem for Volynov, as the Soyuz service module was much larger than the small retropack the earlier vehicles employed.

When the Soyuz started aerobraking in the upper reaches of the atmosphere, the combined spacecraft sought the most aerodynamically stable position - nose forward, with the heavy descent module facing directly into the air stream with only its light metal entry hatch at the front to protect it. The gaskets sealing the hatch began to burn, filling the compartment with dangerous fumes and smoke. The deceleration, while normal for reentry, pulled Volynov outward against his harness rather than against the padded seat. As the thermal and aerodynamic stresses on the combined craft increased, struts between the descent and service modules broke off or burned through before the hatch failed. The descent module immediately righted itself once the service module was gone, with the heat shield forward to take the brunt of re-entry.

There was one final problem in store for Volynov when the parachute cables partially tangled and the soft-landing rockets failed, resulting in a hard impact which broke some of his teeth. It would be seven years until Volynov flew again, on Soyuz 21.

A similar incident occurred decades later with Soyuz TMA-11 on 19 April 2008, though the latter's landing was not as rough.

EVA details 
The mission had extravehicular activity (EVA) objectives similar to those planned for Apollo 9. Soyuz 4 launched first, and was the active vehicle in the docking with Soyuz 5. The news agency TASS stated that: "there was a mutual mechanical coupling of the ships... and their electrical circuits were connected. Thus, the world's first experimental cosmic station with four compartments for the crew was assembled and began functioning".

Moscow TV carried the cosmonauts' EVA preparations live. Khrunov and Yeliseyev put on their Yastreb ("hawk") suits in the Soyuz 5 orbital module with aid from commander Boris Volynov. Yastreb suit design commenced in 1965, shortly after Alexei Leonov's difficult EVA. Leonov served as a consultant for the design process, which was completed during 1966. Suit fabrication and testing occurred in 1967, but the Soyuz 1 accident in April of that year and Soyuz docking difficulties on the Soyuz 2 and Soyuz 3 missions delayed their use in space until the Soyuz 4 and Soyuz 5 flights. To prevent the suit from ballooning, the Yastreb suit used a pulley-and-cable articulation system. Wide metal rings around the gray nylon canvas undersuit's upper arms served as anchors for the upper body articulation system. The Yastreb had a regenerative life support system in a rectangular white metal box placed on the chest and abdomen to facilitate movement through the Soyuz's hatchways.

Volynov checked out Khrunov and Yeliseyev's life support and communications systems before returning to the descent module, sealing the hatch, and depressurizing the orbital module. Khrunov went out first, transferring to the Soyuz 4 orbital module while the docked spacecraft were out of radio contact with the Soviet Union over South America. Yeliseyev transferred while the spacecraft were over the Soviet Union. They closed the Soyuz 4 orbital module hatch behind them, then Soyuz 4 commander Vladimir Shatalov repressurised the orbital module and entered to help Khrunov and Yeliseyev get out of their suits. The spacewalkers delivered newspapers, letters, and telegrams printed after Shatalov lifted off to help prove that the transfer took place. Soyuz 4 and 5 separated after only four hours and thirty-five minutes together.

See also 

 List of spacewalks
 Soviet moonshot

References

External links 
 Flight Journal: "Soyuz 5's Flaming Return" by James Oberg
 Encyclopedia Astronautica on Soyuz 5
 Союз-4 и Союз-5 (1969), a 20-minute documentation in Russian language, available on YouTube.com

Crewed Soyuz missions
Spacecraft launched in 1969
Spacecraft which reentered in 1969
1969 in the Soviet Union